German submarine U-644 was a Type VIIC U-boat of Nazi Germany's Kriegsmarine during World War II. The submarine was laid down on 1 December 1941 at the Blohm & Voss yard at Hamburg, launched on 20 August 1942, and commissioned on 15 October 1942 under the command of Oberleutnant zur See Kurt Jensen.

Attached to 5th U-boat Flotilla based at Kiel, U-644 completed her training period on 31 March 1943 and was assigned to front-line service.

Design
German Type VIIC submarines were preceded by the shorter Type VIIB submarines. U-644 had a displacement of  when at the surface and  while submerged. She had two shafts and two  propellers.

U-644 was fitted with five  torpedo tubes (four fitted at the bow and one at the stern), fourteen torpedoes, one  SK C/35 naval gun, 220 rounds, and one twin  C/30 anti-aircraft gun. The boat had a complement of between forty-four and sixty.

Service history
In April 1943, U-644 was on patrol between Shetland and Jan Mayen. British signals intelligence had pinpointed the U-boat's position and HMS Tuna was dispatched to hunt down U-644. Two torpedoes hit U-644, which sank with all 45 crew members on board, there were no survivors.

References

Bibliography

External links

World War II submarines of Germany
German Type VIIC submarines
1942 ships
Ships built in Hamburg
U-boats commissioned in 1942
U-boats sunk in 1943
U-boats sunk by British submarines
Ships lost with all hands
World War II shipwrecks in the Norwegian Sea
Maritime incidents in April 1943